Dennis Howitt is a British psychologist. He is a reader in Applied Psychology at Loughborough University and the author of numerous psychology textbooks.  He is a chartered forensic psychologist and a Fellow of the British Psychological Society. His publications also include books on statistics, computing and methodology.

Life and career

Howitt completed a first class honours degree in psychology at Brunel University in 1967 and earned his PhD at the University of Sussex. In 1970 he became research officer at Leicester University's Centre for Mass Communication Research. His research career began with the study of mass communications, especially with reference to crime, violence and pornography, but he has since broadened his research to the application of psychology to social issues.

He has also written on racism in the field of psychology, as well as forensic psychology, specifically paedophiles, sex offenders, and child abuse.

Selected publications
Howitt D, Cramer D (2011). Introduction to SPSS Statistics in Psychology. Pearson Education, 
Howitt D (2010). Introduction to qualitative methods in psychology. Prentice Hall, 
Howitt D (2009). Introduction to forensic and criminal psychology. Pearson Education, 
Hair JF, Tabachnick BG, Howitt D (2009). Mixed ANOVA and multiple regression: Readings. Pearson Australia, 
Howitt D, Cramer D (2009).  Introduction to Research Methods in Psychology. Prentice Hall, 
Howitt D, Cramer D (2009). Introduction to Statistics in Psychology. Prentice Hall, 
 Sheldon K, Dennis Howitt D (2007). Sex offenders and the Internet. John Wiley and Sons,  
Howitt D, Cramer D (2005).  Introduction to SPSS in psychology. Pearson Prentice Hall, 
 Cramer D, Howitt D (2004).  The Sage dictionary of statistics. SAGE,  
Howitt D (2004). What is the role of fantasy in sex offending? Crim Behav Ment Health. 2004;14(3):182-8.  
Howitt D (2002).  Forensic and criminal psychology. Prentice Hall, 
Owusu-Bempah K, Howitt D (2000). Psychology beyond Western perspectives. Wiley-Blackwell, 
Howitt D, Cramer D (2000). First steps in research and statistics: A practical workbook for psychology students. Psychology Press, 
Howitt D, Cramer D (2000). An introduction to statistics in psychology: A complete guide for students (2nd ed.). Prentice Hall, 
Howitt, D (1998). Crime, the media and the law. Wiley. 
Howitt D, Cramer D (1997).  A guide to computing statistics with SPSS for Windows. Prentice Hall/Harvester Wheatsheaf, 
Howitt D (1995). Paedophiles and sexual offences against children. J. Wiley. 
Howitt D (1995). Pornography and the paedophile: is it criminogenic? Br J Med Psychol. 1995 Mar;68 ( Pt 1):15-27. 
Howitt D, Owusu-Bempah K (1994). The racism of psychology. Harvester Wheatsheaf. 
Howitt D (1992).  Child abuse errors: when good intentions go wrong. Harvester Wheatsheaf, 
Howitt D (1991). Concerning psychology: psychology applied to social issues. Open University Press, 
Howitt D (1990). Britain's "substance abuse policy": realities and regulation in the United Kingdom. Int J Addict. 1990-1991;25(3A):353-76. 
Cumberbatch G, Howitt D( 1989). A measure of uncertainty: the effects of the mass media. J. Libbey, 
Howitt D (1982). The mass media and social problems. Pergamon Press, 
 Howitt D Cumberbatch G (1975). Mass media, violence and society. Wiley, 
 Howitt D Cumberbatch G (1972). Affective feeling for a film character and evaluation of an anti-social act. Br J Soc Clin Psychol. 1972 Jun;11(2):102-8.

References

External links
Dennis Howitt via Loughborough University

Living people
Year of birth missing (living people)
British psychologists
Alumni of Brunel University London
Alumni of the University of Sussex